Oktyabrsky is a rural locality (a settlement) in Pervomayskoye Rural Settlement, Ertilsky District, Voronezh Oblast, Russia. The population was 90 as of 2010. There are 4 streets.

References 

Rural localities in Ertilsky District